Macroglossum ungues is a moth of the Sphingidae family. It is known from Indonesia, from Java to Ambon, and also the Philippines and Taiwan.

Subspecies
Macroglossum ungues ungues
Macroglossum ungues cheni Yen, Kitching & Tzen, 2003 (Lanyu Island in Taiwan)

References

Macroglossum
Moths of the Philippines
Moths of Indonesia
Moths of Taiwan
Moths described in 1903